East Gate Square is a shopping center complex located along the border between Moorestown and Mount Laurel in New Jersey. East Gate Square is adjacent to the Moorestown Mall and is accessible from Interstate 295, Route 38, and Route 73.

The six shopping centers were developed by BPG Properties between 1992 and 2002, and the first one opened in 1993.

Buildings
Phase I – 
Phase II – 
Phase III – 
Phase IV – 
Phase V – 
Phase VI –

References

External links

Buildings and structures in Burlington County, New Jersey
Moorestown, New Jersey
Mount Laurel, New Jersey
Shopping malls established in 1993
Shopping malls in New Jersey
1993 establishments in New Jersey